Freedom's Goblin is the tenth studio album by the American garage rock musician Ty Segall, released on January 26, 2018 on Drag City. The album is Segall's second to be recorded with his backing band The Freedom Band, formed during the recording of his previous album, Ty Segall.

At seventy-five minutes, the album is Segall's longest to date, exceeding 2014's Manipulator.

Writing and composition
Regarding the album's varied aesthetic, Segall noted, "I'd say that the theme is the anti-theme, and the idea is to be free, hence the name Freedom's Goblin. I have made a lot of records that have had specific restrictions and confinements in the concept, but for this record the idea was that no idea is inappropriate, no space where we're going to record or create is wrong. The more far out, and the more free we get, the better things are."

Reception

The album received widespread positive reviews, with a score of 84 on Metacritic, indicating "universal acclaim".

Track listing

Charts

References

2018 albums
Ty Segall albums
Drag City (record label) albums